The 2024 World Junior Ice Hockey Championship Division I is two international ice hockey tournaments organized by the International Ice Hockey Federation. It consists of two tiered groups of six teams each: the second-tier Division I A and the third-tier Division I B. For each tier's tournament, the team which will place first will be promoted to the next higher division, while the team which place last will be relegated to a lower division.

To be eligible as a junior player in these tournaments, a player can't be born earlier than 2004

Division I A

Participants

Standings

Division I B

Participants

Standings

Sources 

 

Hockey
World Junior Ice Hockey Championships